Amomum is a genus of plants native to China, the Indian subcontinent, Southeast Asia, New Guinea, and Queensland. It includes several species of cardamom, especially black cardamom. Plants of this genus are remarkable for their pungency and aromatic properties.

Among ancient writers, the name amomum was ascribed to various odoriferous plants that cannot be positively identified today. The word derives from Latin amomum, which is the latinisation of the Greek ἄμωμον (amomon), a kind of an Indian spice plant. Edmund Roberts noted on his 1834 trip to China that amomum was used as a spice to "season sweet dishes" in culinary practice.

Selected species
See List of Amomum species for a complete list.

The following have further information:
Amomum exertum
Amomum smithiae
Amomum subulatum (black cardamom) - type species

Placed elsewhere
The following species are now placed in other genera:
Amomum compactum is Alpinia nutans
Amomum costatum is Hornstedtia costata (Roxb.) K.Schum.
Amomum dallachyi is a synonym of Meistera dallachyi (F.Muell.) Skornick. & M.F.Newman
Amomum epiphyticum R.M.Sm. is a synonym of Epiamomum epiphyticum (R.M.Sm.) A.D.Poulsen & Skornick.
Amomum filiforme is Hedychium coronarium
Amomum pulchellum is Cyphostigma (monotypic)
Amomum tsao-ko is Lanxangia tsaoko
 Elettaria cardamomum (L.) Maton is: Amomum ensal, Amomum repens, Amomum repens & Amomum uncinatum
Amomum mioga is Zingiber mioga
Amomum melegueta is Aframomum melegueta
Amomum zambesiacum is Aframomum zambesiacum
Now be placed in the reconstituted genus Wurfbainia:
Amomum elegans
 Wurfbainia uliginosa is: Amomum uliginosum, Amomum robustum & Amomum ovoideum
Amomum villosum

See also
 Aframomum

References

External links
 

 
Zingiberaceae genera